Jaliseh (also Romanized as Jalīseh; also known as Jalīseh-ye Pā’īn) is a village in Pir Kuh Rural District, Deylaman District, Siahkal County, Gilan Province, Iran. At the 2006 census, its population was 659, in 171 families.

References 

Populated places in Siahkal County